The 18th Coast Artillery Regiment was  a Coast Artillery regiment in the United States Army. It was the Regular Army component of the Harbor Defenses of the Columbia, replacing the 3rd Coast Artillery there. Other elements of the regiment were also part of the Harbor Defenses of San Francisco. The regiment was active from 1940 until withdrawn in April 1944 and inactivated the following month as part of an Army-wide reorganization.

Lineage 1
Constituted as the 18th Artillery (Coast Artillery Corps) (C.A.C.) and organized October 1918 at Fort Winfield Scott, California, but demobilized in December 1918. This was one of a number of Coast Artillery regiments mobilized to operate heavy and railway artillery on the Western Front in World War I, but the Armistice resulted in the dissolution of the 18th.

Lineage 2
Constituted in the Regular Army 19 January 1940 as 18th Coast Artillery (Harbor Defense) (HD), and organized 1 February 1940 at Fort Stevens. Regimental HHB, 1st Battalion HHB, and Batteries A and B were organized 1 February 1940 by redesignating HHD, Btrys E and F, and Panama Detachment, 3rd Coast Artillery (HD) Regiment, Fort Stevens. The 18th CA (HD) relieved the 3rd CA (HD) in the Harbor Defenses of the Columbia. The 249th Coast Artillery was the Oregon National Guard component of those defenses.
 Battery C activated at Fort Stevens 3 January 1941.
 HHB 2nd Battalion and Batteries D, E, & F constituted 1 February 1940 and activated at Fort Winfield Scott in HD San Francisco 15 January 1941.
 Battery G (searchlight) activated at Fort Stevens 10 June 1941.
 Battery F moved to Fort Miley 21 November 1941.
 Regimental HHB and 2nd Battalion (less Battery F) moved to Fort Funston in HD San Francisco 7 December 1941.
 On 21 June 1942 the bombardment of Fort Stevens by Japanese submarine I-25 occurred with relatively minor damage.
 Various exchanges of personnel occurred in HD of the Columbia between the 18th CA (HD) and the 249th Coast Artillery (HD) in November 1942, August 1943, and January 1944.
 Battery G moved to Fort Canby around 1 January 1943.
 Regimental HHB ordered to XXII Corps at Camp Breckinridge, Kentucky 14 April 1944, assets absorbed by HD of the Columbia and HD San Francisco by 27 April 1944. HHB inactivated 5 May 1944.

Campaign streamers
World War II
 Pacific Theater without inscription

See also
 Distinctive unit insignia (U.S. Army)
 Seacoast defense in the United States
 United States Army Coast Artillery Corps
 Harbor Defense Command

References

 
 Gaines, William C., Coast Artillery Organizational History, 1917-1950, Coast Defense Journal, vol. 23, issue 2
 Gaines, William C., Historical Sketches Coast Artillery Regiments 1917-1950, National Guard Army Regiments 197-265

External links

 Official US Army lineage website for current units 
 Forts of the Pacific coast at the Coast Defense Study Group website
 FortWiki, lists most CONUS and Canadian forts
 American Forts Network, lists forts in the US, former US territories, Canada, and Central America

018
Military units and formations in California
Military units and formations in Oregon
Military units and formations in Washington (state)
Military units and formations established in 1918
Military units and formations disestablished in 1918
Military units and formations established in 1940
Military units and formations disestablished in 1944